Stanley Gawurra Gaykamangu, known mononymously as Gawurra, is an Australian singer-songwriter hailing from Milingimbi, North East Arnhem. He sings in the Gupapuyngu language.

His debut album Ratja Yaliyali (which means "vine of love") is a collection of songs inspired by the traditional songlines of his hometown.  The album was recorded at CAAMA Music in Alice Springs, Australia. 

At the 2016 National Indigenous Music Awards, Ratja Yaliyali received awards for Album of the Year and New Talent of the Year.  The album also received awards for Cover Art and Film Clip. It was nominated for Best World Music Album at the 2016 ARIA Awards.

Discography

Albums

Awards and nominations

ARIA Music Awards
The ARIA Music Awards is an annual awards ceremony that recognises excellence, innovation, and achievement across all genres of Australian music. They commenced in 1987.

! 
|-
| 2016
| Ratja Yaliyali
| ARIA Award for Best World Music Album
| 
| 
|-

National Indigenous Music Awards
The National Indigenous Music Awards recognise excellence, innovation and leadership among Aboriginal and Torres Strait Islander musicians from throughout Australia. They commenced in 2004.

! 
|-
| rowspan="5"| 2016
| Gawurra
| New Talent of the Year
| 
| rowspan="5"| 
|-
| rowspan="2"| Ratja Yaliyali
| Album of the Year
| 
|-
| Cover Art of the Year
| 
|-
| rowspan="2"| "Ratja Yaliyali"
| Film Clip of the Year
| 
|-
| Song of the Year
| 
|-

References

Living people
Indigenous Australian musicians
Australian male singers
Australian male singer-songwriters
People from the Northern Territory
Year of birth missing (living people)